An incomplete list of bridges in Liberia.

Montserrado County
Gabriel Tucker Bridge
Mesurado Bridge
Stockton Creek Bridge
St. Paul's Bridge
Via Town Bridge

Elsewhere
George W. Bush Bridge, Grand Kru County
Sarbo Bridge, River Gee and Maryland counties
Borlola River Bridge, Margibi County
Greenville Bridge

References

Liberia
Bridges
Bridges